The Masonic Center (also known as the Masonic Temple) is a Renaissance style building in Grand Forks, North Dakota. It was designed by architect Joseph Bell DeRemer and was constructed by the Dinnie Brothers in 1913.  It replaced the first Masonic Temple in Grand Forks, which had burned, and which was later reconstructed as the Stratford Building.

This building was listed on the National Register of Historic Places in 1982.

References

Renaissance Revival architecture in North Dakota
Masonic buildings completed in 1913
Masonic buildings in North Dakota
Joseph Bell DeRemer buildings
Clubhouses on the National Register of Historic Places in North Dakota
1913 establishments in North Dakota
National Register of Historic Places in Grand Forks, North Dakota